Pak Chau or Tree Island is an island at the northwest water of Hong Kong. It is offshore of Lung Kwu Tan near Tuen Mun in the New Territories.

Conservation
Since 1996, the island, Lung Kwu Chau, and Sha Chau are within the boundaries of the Sha Chau and Lung Kwu Chau Marine Park. The three islands have been listed as a Site of Special Scientific Interest since 1979. It is known as a dolphin sanctuary and a habitat for the Chinese white dolphin.

See also

 Islands of Hong Kong

References

Uninhabited islands of Hong Kong
Tuen Mun District
Islands of Hong Kong